Yemen competed at the 2014 Summer Youth Olympics, in Nanjing, China from 16 August to 28 August 2014.

Athletics

Yemen qualified one athlete.

Qualification Legend: Q=Final A (medal); qB=Final B (non-medal); qC=Final C (non-medal); qD=Final D (non-medal); qE=Final E (non-medal)

Girls
Track & road events

Taekwondo

Yemen was given a wild card to compete.

Boys

Wrestling

Yemen was given a spot to compete from the Tripartite Commission.

Boys

References

You
Nations at the 2014 Summer Youth Olympics
Yemen at the Youth Olympics